Outeiro is a civil parish in the municipality of Bragança, Portugal. The population in 2011 was 301, in an area of 40.93 km².

References

Parishes of Bragança, Portugal